Hakim Abul-Majd Majdūd ibn Ādam Sanā'ī Ghaznavi, more commonly known as Sanai, was a Persian poet from Ghazni who lived his life in the Ghaznavid Empire which is now located in Afghanistan. He was born in 1080 and died between 1131 and 1141.

Life

Sanai was a Sunni Muslim. He was connected with the court of the Ghaznavid Bahram-shah who ruled 1117 – 1157.

Works
He wrote an enormous quantity of mystical verse, of which The Walled Garden of Truth or The Hadiqat al Haqiqa (حدیقه الحقیقه و شریعه الطریقه) is his master work and the first Persian mystical epic of Sufism. Dedicated to Bahram Shah, the work expresses the poet's ideas on God, love, philosophy and reason.

For close to 900 years The Walled Garden of Truth has been consistently read as a classic and employed as a Sufi textbook. According to Major T. Stephenson: "Sanai’s fame has always rested on his Hadiqa; it is the best known and in the East by far the most esteemed of his works; it is in virtue of this work that he forms one of the great trio of Sufi teachers — Sanai, Attar, Jalaluddin Rumi."  Sanai taught that lust, greed and emotional excitement stood between humankind and divine knowledge, which was the only true reality (Haqq).  Love (Ishq) and a social conscience are for him the foundation of religion; mankind is asleep, living in a desolate world. To Sanai common religion was only habit and ritual.

Sanai's poetry had a tremendous influence upon Persian literature.  He is considered the first poet to use the qasidah (ode), ghazal (lyric), and the masnavi (rhymed couplet) to express the philosophical, mystical and ethical ideas of Sufism.

Influence and legacy

Poetic influence 
Rumi acknowledged Sanai and Attar as his two great inspirations, saying, "Attar is the soul and Sanai its two eyes, I came after Sanai and Attar." The Walled Garden of Truth was also a model for Nizami's Makhzan al-Asrar (Treasury of Secrets).

Modern cultural references 
There is a reference to Hakim Sanai's poetry near the end of the 2017 film The Shape of Water by Guillermo del Toro. In the final scene of the movie, the narrator recites a few verses of poetry without specific attribution, although there is a reference in the film's credit sequence to "Adapted works by Hakim Sanai." Researching for the Library of Congress blog From the Catbird Seat, Peter Armenti confirmed with the assistance of Catbird blog readers that the poem spoken at the end of The Shape of Water is del Toro's adaptation of Priya Hemenway's translation of an original poem by Hakim Sanai. Hemenway's translation appears in The Book of Everything: Journey of the Heart’s Desire : Hakim Sanai’s Walled Garden of Truth (2002).

Quotations

 Sanai's poetry stresses the possibility of an "awakening";

While mankind remains mere baggage in the world
It will be swept along, as in a boat, asleep.
What can they see in sleep?
What real merit or punishment can there be?

He who knows not his own soul, how shall he know the soul of another? and he who only knows hand and foot, how shall he know the Godhead? The prophets are unequal to understanding this matter; why dost thou foolishly claim to do so? When thou hast brought forward a demonstration of this subject, then thou wilt know the pure essence of the faith; otherwise what have faith and thou in common? thou hadst best be silent, and speak not folly. The learned talk nonsense all; for true religion is not woven about the feet of everyone.

His means for this awakening is surrender to God, his poetry has been called "the essential fragrance of the path of love". He hits out at human hypocrisy and folly;

Others are heedless,—do thou be wise, and on this path keep thy tongue silent. The condition laid on such a one is that he should receive all food and drink from the Causer, not from the causes. Go, suffer hardship, if thou wouldst be cherished; and if not, be content with the road to Hell. None ever attained his object without enduring hardship.

See also

List of Persian poets and authors
Persian literature
Rumi
Nizami Ganjavi
Attar of Nishapur
Notable Sanai researchers: 
Mohammad-Reza Shafiei Kadkani
Mohammad Taghi Modarres Razavi
Mohammad Jafar Yahaghi

Notes

References
 "Hadiqat al-Haqiqa wa Shari'at al-Tariqa" In Encyclopædia Iranica by J.T.P. De Bruijn 
 E.G. Browne. Literary History of Persia. (Four volumes, 2,256 pages, and twenty-five years in the writing). 1998. 
 Jan Rypka, History of Iranian Literature. Reidel Publishing Company. 1968 . 
 Bo Utas, A Persian Sufi Poem: Vocabulary and terminology. Scandinavian Institute of Asian Studies Monograph Series, Curzon Press, 1977.

Further reading

 Sanai in original Persian
 A Thousand Years of Persian Rubaiyat: An Anthology of Quatrains from the Tenth to the Twentieth Century Along With the Original Persian by Reza Saberi (Paperback - Nov 2000)
 Diwan i Hakeem Sanai Ghaznavi - Foreword and research by Rahi Mu'airi. Maktab Kahkashan. Mashad, Iran.
 Sanai, D. L. Pendlebury [Trans] (1974) The Walled Garden of Truth - Abridged (London: Octagon Press)
 English translation of parts of the Hadiqa
 The first book of the Hadiqatu'l-Haqiqat translated into English, at archive.org.

Sufi poets
Iranian Sufis
12th-century Persian-language poets
11th-century births
1130s deaths
Wisdom literature
11th-century  Persian-language poets
Ghaznavid-period poets
Sanai
11th-century Iranian people
12th-century Iranian people